Minucia is a genus of moths in the family Erebidae. The genus was erected by Moore in 1885.

Species
 Minucia bimaculata Osthelder, 1933
 Minucia heliothis Reberl, 1917
 Minucia lunaris (Denis & Schiffermüller, 1775) – lunar double-stripe, brown underwing
 Minucia profana Eversmann, 1857
 Minucia wiskotti Püngeler, 1901

References

Ophiusini
Moth genera